Freddi is an Italian surname. Notable people with the surname include:

Amadio Freddi (1570–1634), Italian composer
Gianluca Freddi, Italian footballer
Luigi Freddi (1895–1977), Italian journalist and politician

Fictional characters 
Freddi Fish, fictional character in the popular Humongous Entertainment game series of the same name.
 Freddi, the nickname of Frieda, a distant descendant of Fred in the book The Time Warp Trio: 2095

See also
Freddy (disambiguation)

Italian-language surnames